Rinaldo Wayne Walcott (born 1965) is a Canadian academic and writer. He wrote in 2021 "I was born in the Caribbean Barbados and have lived most of my life in Canada, specifically Toronto."<ref>On Property (Biblioasis, 2021); 'Toronto Star, 6 Feb. 2021; and Library of Congress Authorities file.</ref> Walcott is Professor and Chair of Africana and American Studies at the University at Buffalo. He holds the Carl V. Granger Chair in Africana and American Studies. Previously, he was an associate professor at the Ontario Institute for Studies in Education and the director of the Women and Gender Studies Institute at the University of Toronto. He was also affiliated with the Cinema Studies Institute at the University of Toronto. Walcott was formerly an assistant professor at York University. From 2002 to 2007, he was the Canada Research Chair of Social Justice and Cultural Studies.

Walcott's work focuses on Black studies, Canadian studies, cultural studies, queer theory, gender studies, and diaspora studies. He is out as queer.

 Work 

Walcott published Black Like Who? in 1997, coming out of research related to his PhD studies which focused on, in Walcott's own words, "questions of popular culture and exploring how rap music in the early 1990s was emerging as an important social and political force across North America". The collection of essays in Black Like Who? expand this inquiry into areas such as poetry, literature, diasporic studies, film criticism and other discussions central to issues surrounding Black space, place, and landscape in Canada.

 Selected publications 

 2021, The Long Emancipation: Moving toward Black Freedom (Durham, NC: Duke University Press)
 2021, On Property (Windsor, Ontario: Biblioasis).
 2019, BlackLife: Post-BLM and the Struggle for Freedom with Idil Abdillahi (Winnipeg: ARP Books).
 2016, Queer Returns: Essays On Multiculturalism, Diaspora and Black Studies (Toronto: Insomniac Press).
 2003, Black Like Who?: Writing Black Canada (Toronto: Insomniac Press). [Second Revised Edition]
 2000, Rude: Contemporary Black Canadian Cultural Criticism [editor] (Toronto: Insomniac Press).
 1997, Black Like Who?: Writing Black Canada'' (Toronto: Insomniac Press).

References 

Barbadian emigrants to Canada
Black Canadian writers
Canadian non-fiction writers
Living people
Canadian sociologists
Canadian literary critics
Academic staff of the University of Toronto
Canada Research Chairs
Canadian gay writers
1965 births
Black Canadian LGBT people
Black Canadian scientists